Bisheh Sara (also Romanized as Bīsheh Sarā) is a village in Ziabar Rural District, in the Central District of Sowme'eh Sara County, Gilan Province, Iran. At the 2006 census, its population was 114, in 35 families.

References 

Populated places in Sowme'eh Sara County